Ferenc Szilveszter (born 26 November 1971) is a former Hungarian footballer who played as a midfielder for several clubs in Hungary.

Club career
Szilveszter began his professional career with Vasas SC and went on to play for MTK Budapest FC and Békéscsabai Előre FC.

International career
Szilveszter made four appearances for the senior Hungary national football team. He made his debut in a friendly against Iran on 20 April 1998.

References

External links
 

1971 births
Living people
Hungarian footballers
Hungary international footballers
Vasas SC players
MTK Budapest FC players
Békéscsaba 1912 Előre footballers
Association football midfielders
People from Szekszárd
Sportspeople from Tolna County